The St. Louis Brown Stockings baseball club played one season in the National Association, 1875, and two in the National League, 1876–1877. Here is a list of all their players in regular season games.

† Bold names identify members of the National Baseball Hall of Fame.



A

B
Joe Battin
Joe Blong
George Bradley

C
Jack Chapman
John Clapp
Art Croft
Ned Cuthbert

D
Herman Dehlman
Mike Dorgan

E

F
Frank Fleet
Davy Force

G
Pud Galvin†
Jack Gleason

H
Bill Hague

I

J

K

L
Leonidas Lee
Harry Little
Tom Loftus

M
Denny Mack
Mike McGeary
Ed McKenna
Tom Miller (catcher)

N
T. E. Newell
Tricky Nichols

O

P
Dickey Pearce
Lip Pike

Q

R
Jack Remsen

S
George Seward

T

U

V

W
Charlie Waitt

X

Y

Z

External links
Baseball Reference

Major League Baseball all-time rosters